This is a list of earthquakes in 1990. Only earthquakes of magnitude 6 or above are included, unless they result in damage and/or casualties, or are notable for some other reason.  All dates are listed according to UTC time.

By death toll

By magnitude

Listed are earthquakes with at least 7.0 magnitude.

By month

January

February

March

April

May

June

July

August

September

October

November

December

See also
 
 Lists of 20th-century earthquakes
 Lists of earthquakes by year

References

1990
1990
1990